Gilbert John Hendrie (15 July 1901 – 24 June 1968) was an Australian rules footballer who played with Hawthorn in the Victorian Football League (VFL).

Family
The fifth son of Thomas Bruce Hendrie and Alice Charlotte Ingram, Hendrie grew up in the Hawthorn area. He was the younger brother of Melbourne’s Bill Hendrie and the grandfather of John Hendrie.

Football
A tall man for his era, he was a centre half-forward and originally played for Camberwell Football Club before transferring to Hawthorn when they joined the VFL. He played in 1925 and 1927 and was a prominent member of the team in Hawthorn's first ever VFL match.

After football
Gil Hendrie married Isabella Victoria Deering in 1926 and after football he became a partner in Deering's Bakery in Camberwell before retiring to Mornington. 

Gil Hendrie died in 1968 at the age of 66 and was cremated at Springvale Botanical Cemetery.

Notes

External links 

1901 births
1968 deaths
Australian rules footballers from Melbourne
Hawthorn Football Club players
Camberwell Football Club players
People from Richmond, Victoria
Burials in Victoria (Australia)